The R205 road is a regional road in Ireland from the R199 road in County Leitrim to the Northern Ireland border at County Fermanagh, mostly in County Cavan. A number of factories of the former Quinn Group are located along the road.

From the R199, the road goes northeast to Ballyconnell. Leaving Ballyconnell, the road goes north to the Fermanagh border, where the road then becomes the B127 (Northern Ireland).

See also
Regional road
List of B roads in Northern Ireland

References

Regional roads in the Republic of Ireland
Roads in County Cavan
Roads in County Leitrim